The Chief Minister of Sabaragamuwa Province, Sri Lanka is the head of the provincial board of ministers, a body which aids and advises the governor, the head of the provincial government, in the exercise of his executive power. The governor appoints as chief minister the member of the Sabaragamuwa Provincial Council who, in his opinion, commands the support of a majority of that council. The current chief minister is Maheepala Herath.

Chief ministers

References

External links
 

 
Sabaragamuwa